Evaraina Epudaina is a 2009 Telugu-language romantic comedy film directed and written by Marthand K Shankar. It stars Varun Sandesh and Vimala Raman, released on 26 June 2009.

Plot
Venkat is a carefree guy. He is a smart youngster who looks for people around him who are in love, then he blackmails them by threatening to tell their family of their love unless they pay him money for his silence. He gets into a fight because he took money from a couple by blackmailing, there he sees a girl Madhumita and it is love at first sight for Venkat. Meanwhile, his grandma gets hurt and he takes her to a hospital, an old woman is admitted in the same room, later he finds out she is Madhumita's grandma. He gets an opportunity to impress her, he pretends to save her grandma and they both become good friends. Venkat's close friend confesses him that he is in love with the daughter of Madhumita's father. He thinks that his friend is going to be engaged to Madhumita.

This prompts Venkat to play a spoilsport during the engagement ceremony, he tries to break the engagement and also succeeds in breaking the engagement. Soon after the engagement breaks he realised that his friend is in love with Madhumita's sister and was getting engaged to her. Venkat is shocked and is in a fixed situation as he can't tell the truth to Madhumita and her family as they would hate him after knowing the truth. He gets close to her family in the meantime, also Madhumita falls in love with him. In the temple, she overhears Venkat's friend telling him that it was a good plan to break Adarsh and Madumita's sister's engagement. Venkat sees Madhumita and tries to explain to her that it was an misunderstanding, but she was not ready to listen. Venkat then become a responsible person and joins his brother's office, he respects lovers and understands other's feeling. He also manages to get Adarsh and Madhumita's sister together in the meantime. He then goes to Madhumita and explains to her and tries to convince her that everything was a misunderstanding, he tells her that he is a changed person and has got a good job for her. She understands him and his feeling's, the film ends with Venkat and Madhumita getting together.

Cast
 Varun Sandesh as Venkat
 Vimala Raman as Madhumita
 Rama Prabha as Madhumita's grandma
 Giri Babu as Madhumita's father
 Ali as Shivam, Madhumita's brother-in-law
 Rashmi Gautam as Madhumita's sister
 Venu Madhav as Dr. Bhargav
 Brahmanandam as Kutumba Rao (special appearance)
 Aadarsh Balakrishna as Raja
 Duvvasi Mohan
 Ramaprabha
 Surekha Vani

Soundtrack
The music was composed by Mani Sharma and released by Aditya Music. The Audio launch function was held on the night of 1 June 2009, at  Green Park Hotel, Hyderabad.

References 

2009 films
2000s Telugu-language films
Films scored by Mani Sharma
AVM Productions films